KDX may refer to:

 Knocked Down eXport
 Korean Destroyer eXperimental, a Korean shipbuilding program
 KDX (software), a Bulletin Board System-style program (à la Hotline) by Haxial.